The following lists events that happened during 2016 in Finland.

Incumbents 
 President: Sauli Niinistö
 Prime Minister: Juha Sipilä
 Speaker: Maria Lohela

Events

January
 Four pairs of municipalities were merged  Hämeenkoski with Hollola, Jalasjärvi with Kurikka,  Köyliö with  Säkylä and  Nastola with Lahti.

February
 First ever face transfer operation in Nordic countries was made in Helsinki

March
 Church in Ylivieska was destroyed in a fire

April

May
 Finland became running-up in 2016 IIHF World Championship

June
 Three parties selected new chairmen: Petteri Orpo for Coalition, Li Andersson for Left Alliance, Anna-Maja Henriksson for SFP

July

August

September

October

November
 City council of Tampere approved building of light rail system.

December
 December 16
 A dangerous fire breaks out around 10:00 am at the Terrafame nickel mine in Sotkamo. The fire began in the mine's Hydrogen sulfide generator.
 A White-tailed eagle is discovered dead in Rauma, Satakunta, and the cause of death was later verified as the H5N8 virus. This is the first confirmed instance of avian flu on the Finnish mainland.
 December 25
 Ten thousand households within Southwest Finland go without power for an hour after an equipment failure at grid operator Fingrid's hub in the town of Uusikaupunki.
 December 29
 President Sauli Niinistö appoints Mika Lintilä, an MP for the Centre Party, as the Minister of Economic Affairs.
 The Helsinki District Court imposes a ten-year custodial prison sentence on Jari Aarnio, the former head of the anti-drug crime unit in Helsinki.

Sports
2015–16 Liiga season
2016 Finnish Figure Skating Championships
Finland at the 2016 Summer Olympics

Deaths

January 

 8 January – Risto Syrjänen, 90, Finnish Olympic hurdler.
 10 January – Kalevi Lehtovirta, 87, Finnish Olympic footballer (1952).

February 

 4 February – Ulf Söderblom, 85, Finnish conductor.

March 

 1 March – 
 Nestori Kaasalainen, 101, Finnish politician.
 Reijo Kanerva, 72, Finnish footballer.

References 

 
2010s in Finland
Years of the 21st century in Finland
Finland
Finland